(R)-2-Methyl-CBS-oxazaborolidine is an organoboron catalyst that is used in organic synthesis. This catalyst, developed by Itsuno and Elias James Corey, is generated by heating (R)-(+)-2-(diphenylhydroxymethyl) pyrrolidine along with trimethylboroxine or methylboronic acid. It is an excellent tool for the synthesis of alcohols in high enantiomeric ratio. Generally, 2-10 mol% of this catalyst is used along with borane-tetrahydrofuran (THF), borane-dimethylsulfide, borane-N,N-diethylaniline, or diborane as the borane source. Enantioselective reduction using chiral oxazaborolidine catalysts has been used in the synthesis of commercial drugs such as ezetimibe and aprepitant.

See also
 CBS catalyst
 Corey-Itsuno reduction

References

Organoboron compounds
Reagents for organic chemistry
Catalysts
Phenyl compounds
Pyrrolidines